The 2014 Conference Premier play-off Final, known as the 2014 Skrill Premier play-off Final for sponsorship reasons, was a football match between Cambridge United and Gateshead on 18 May 2014 at Wembley Stadium in London. It was the twelfth Conference Premier play-off Final.

Cambridge secured a place in the final after beating F.C. Halifax Town 2–1 on aggregate. Gateshead's place was secured after beating Grimsby Town 4–2 over two legs. This was Cambridge United's 3rd Conference play-off final after losing in 2008 and 2009 and Gateshead's first ever Conference play-off final and their first ever visit to Wembley Stadium.

Cambridge United won the game 2–1 and were promoted to the 2014–15 Football League Two.

Route to the final

Semi-finals
First leg

Second leg

Match

Details

References

play-off Final 2014
2014
Play-off Final 2014
Play-off Final 2014
Conference Premier play-off Final
National League play-off final
Events at Wembley Stadium